YM, Ym, or ym may refer to:

Arts and entertainment 
 YM (magazine), an American teen magazine
 Yngwie J. Malmsteen, Swedish guitarist
 Yokozuna Monogatari, a 1994 Japanese sumo wrestling video game

Businesses and organizations 
 Montenegro Airlines (IATA airport code YM)
 Yarmouth Mariners, a Maritime Junior A Hockey League team
 Youth Meeting, a program of CISV International
 Dow Jones Industrial Average (futures symbol YM)
 Young Marines, an American youth organization that promotes a drug-free lifestyle

Science and technology 
 .ym, the Atari ST/Amstrad CPC YM2149 sound chip format
 YM (selective medium), a selective growth medium which is a combination of yeast and mold
 Yoctomolar (yM), a unit of molar concentration
 Yoctometre (ym), a unit of length or distance
 Yottametre (Ym), a unit of length or distance

Other uses 
 Yam, Ugaritic deity of the sea
 YM, the US Navy Hull classification symbol for a self-propelled dredge
 "Ynn� muuta", a Finnish phrase meaning roughly "and the others" or "etc."